Zhirayr Margaryan (born 13 September 1997) is an Armenian professional footballer who plays for Urartu.

Career

Club
On 22 July 2022, Urartu announced the permanent signing of Margaryan on a one-year contract from Veres Rivne.

International
He made his debut for Armenia national football team on 11 November 2021 in a World Cup qualifier against North Macedonia.

Honours
Ararat Yerevan
 Armenian Cup: 2020–21

Urartu
 Armenian Cup: Runner-up 2021–22

References

External links
 
 

1997 births
Footballers from Yerevan
Living people
Armenian footballers
Armenia youth international footballers
Armenia under-21 international footballers
Armenia international footballers
Association football defenders
FC Urartu players
FC Shirak players
FC Ararat Yerevan players
NK Veres Rivne players
Armenian expatriate footballers
Expatriate footballers in Ukraine
Armenian expatriate sportspeople in Ukraine
Armenian Premier League players